George Abbott (1887–1995) was an American playwright and director.

George Abbott may also refer to:

 George Abbott (GC) (1897–1977), British sailor and George Cross recipient
 George Percy Abbott (1880–1923), British Royal Navy officer and member of the ill-fated Terra Nova Expedition, 1910–13, where he was a member of the Northern Party
 George Abbott (ice hockey) (1911–1996), NHL hockey goalie
 George Abbott (politician) (born 1952), Canadian politician
 George E. Abbott (1858–1942), American politician in the Wyoming Senate
 George Frederick Abbott (1874–1947), English war correspondent and author
 George Henry Abbott (1867–1942), Australian physician
 George Abbitt (1634–1689), also known as George Abbott; founding settler of Norwalk, Connecticut
 George Abbott (Coronation Street)

See also
 George Abbott Theater, currently the Adelphi Theatre, New York
 George Abbot (disambiguation)
 Abbott (surname)